Hallautherium is an extinct genus of morganucodont mammaliaforms from the Late Triassic of Europe. The type species H. schalchi is known from the Klettgau Formation of Switzerland. In addition, a molariform tooth referable to the genus has been found in Poland.

References

Morganucodonts
Prehistoric cynodont genera
Norian genera
Rhaetian genera
Late Triassic synapsids of Europe
Triassic Switzerland
Fossils of Poland
Fossils of Switzerland
Taxa named by William A. Clemens Jr.
Fossil taxa described in 1980